Tim Couch (born August 19, 1961) is an American politician and a Republican member of the Kentucky House of Representatives representing District 90 since January 2003.

Education
Couch attended Hazard Community and Technical College and Cumberland College (now the University of the Cumberlands).

Elections
 2012 Couch was unopposed for both the May 22, 2012 Republican Primary and the November 6, 2012 General election, winning with 11,239 votes.
 2002 Couch challenged District 90 incumbent Representative Barbara Colter in the three-way 2002 Republican Primary, winning with 8,389 votes (60.8%) and was unopposed for the November 5, 2002 General election, winning with 7,514 votes.
 2004 Couch was challenged by former Representative Colter in a one-on-one rematch in the 2004 Republican Primary, winning with 4,185 votes (68.4%) and was unopposed for the November 2, 2004 General election, winning with 9,751 votes.
 2006 Couch was unopposed for both the 2006 Republican Primary and the November 7, 2006 General election, winning with 9,167 votes.
 2008 Couch was challenged in the three-way 2008 Republican Primary, winning with 3,002 votes (65.7%) and was unopposed for the November 4, 2008 General election, winning with 10,636 votes.
 2010 Couch was unopposed for both the May 18, 2010 Republican Primary and the November 2, 2010 General election, winning with 8,841 votes.

References

External links
 Official page at the Kentucky General Assembly
 
 Tim Couch at Ballotpedia
 Tim Couch at the National Institute on Money in State Politics

Place of birth missing (living people)
1961 births
Living people
Republican Party members of the Kentucky House of Representatives
People from Hyden, Kentucky
21st-century American politicians